Dixon Lane-Meadow Creek is a census-designated place (CDP) in Inyo County, California, United States. The population was 2,645 at the 2010 census, down from 2,702 at the 2000 census.

Geography
Dixon Lane-Meadow Creek is located at  (37.383237, -118.417027).

Demographics

2010
The 2010 United States Census reported that Dixon Lane-Meadow Creek had a population of 2,645. The racial makeup of Dixon Lane-Meadow Creek was 2,287 (86.5%) White, 6 (0.2%) African American, 32 (1.2%) Native American, 47 (1.8%) Asian, 3 (0.1%) Pacific Islander, 215 (8.1%) from other races, and 55 (2.1%) from two or more races. Hispanic or Latino of any race were 493 persons (18.6%).

The Census reported that 2,645 people (100% of the population) lived in households, 0 (0%) lived in non-institutionalized group quarters, and 0 (0%) were institutionalized.

There were 1,166 households, out of which 290 (24.9%) had children under the age of 18 living in them, 591 (50.7%) were opposite-sex married couples living together, 95 (8.1%) had a female householder with no husband present, 38 (3.3%) had a male householder with no wife present.  There were 45 (3.9%) unmarried opposite-sex partnerships, and 3 (0.3%) same-sex married couples or partnerships. 388 households (33.3%) were made up of individuals, and 221 (19.0%) had someone living alone who was 65 years of age or older. The average household size was 2.27.  There were 724 families (62.1% of all households); the average family size was 2.92.

The population was spread out, with 587 people (22.2%) under the age of 18, 129 people (4.9%) aged 18 to 24, 489 people (18.5%) aged 25 to 44, 813 people (30.7%) aged 45 to 64, and 627 people (23.7%) who were 65 years of age or older.  The median age was 48.4 years. For every 100 females, there were 93.6 males.  For every 100 females age 18 and over, there were 90.4 males.

The homeowner vacancy rate was 1.5%; the rental vacancy rate was 0.6%.  2,194 people (82.9% of the population) lived in owner-occupied housing units and 451 people (17.1%) lived in rental housing units.

2000
As of the census of 2000, there were 2,702 people, 1,142 households, and 793 families residing in the CDP. The racial makeup of the CDP was 91.38% White, 0.07% Black or African American, 1.30% Native American, 0.67% Asian, 3.74% from other races, and 2.85% from two or more races.  10.03% of the population were Hispanic or Latino of any race.

There were 1,142 households, out of which 28.3% had children under the age of 18 living with them, 56.9% were married couples living together, 8.9% had a female householder with no husband present, and 30.5% were non-families. 27.5% of all households were made up of individuals, and 15.9% had someone living alone who was 65 years of age or older.  The average household size was 2.37 and the average family size was 2.87.

In the CDP, the population was spread out, with 25.3% under the age of 18, 4.7% from 18 to 24, 20.7% from 25 to 44, 25.5% from 45 to 64, and 23.8% who were 65 years of age or older.  The median age was 44 years. For every 100 females there were 91.9 males.  For every 100 females age 18 and over, there were 85.6 males.

The median income for a household in the CDP was $39,341, and the median income for a family was $48,456. Males had a median income of $41,702 versus $27,656 for females. The per capita income for the CDP was $21,263.  About 6.8% of families and 8.6% of the population were below the poverty line, including 11.1% of those under age 18 and 12.5% of those age 65 or over.

Politics

References

Census-designated places in Inyo County, California
Census-designated places in California